Peter Rabbit is a fictional children's book character by Beatrix Potter.

Peter Rabbit can also refer to:
The Tale of Peter Rabbit, 1902 tale by Beatrix Potter
"Peter Rabbit", a 1966 single by Dee Jay and the Runaways
The World of Peter Rabbit and Friends, 1990s anthology TV series
Peter Rabbit (TV series), a 2012 TV series
Peter Rabbit (film), a 2018 film
Peter Rabbit 2: The Runaway, a 2021 sequel
Peter Rabbit, a character in Thornton Burgess' Old Mother West Wind book series
Peter Rabbit, a comic strip by Harrison Cady.
Peter Douthit, a poet who wrote under the name Peter Rabbit.